The World Group II was the second highest level of Fed Cup competition in 2010. Winning nations advanced to the World Group I Play-offs, and losing nations were demoted to the World Group II Play-offs.

Australia vs. Spain

Poland vs. Belgium

Broadcasting rights:  TVP Sport

Estonia vs. Argentina

Slovakia vs. China

References

See also
Fed Cup structure

World Group Ii, 2010 Fed Cup